Hüseyin Altıntaş (born 11 September 1994) is a Turkish professional footballer who plays as a goalkeeper for Süper Lig club Denizlispor.

Club career
Altıntaş is a youth product of the academies of Sarayköy 1926 and Denizlispor. He signed his first professional contract with Denizlospor in 2012, and went on successive loans with Belediye Bingölspor and Sarayköy. A long-term reserve goalkeeper for Denizlispor, Altıntaş made his professional debut with the team in a 2-0 Turkish Cup win over Trabzonspor on 23 January 2020.

References

External links
TFF Profile
Soccerway Profile

1994 births
Living people
Sportspeople from Denizli
Turkish footballers
Denizlispor footballers
Association football goalkeepers
TFF First League players
Süper Lig players